Woodman, Woodmen or Woodmans may refer to:

Places
 Woodman (town), Wisconsin, U.S.
 Woodman, Wisconsin, U.S.
 Woodmans, Washington, U.S.
 Woodman Point, Western Australia
 Woodman station, in Los Angeles, U.S.
 The Woodman, a public house in Birmingham, England

Businesses
 Woodman's Markets, an American supermarket chain
 Woodman Labs, Inc, now GoPro
 WoodmenLife, or Woodmen of the World Life Insurance Society, a not-for-profit fraternal benefit society

Other uses
 Woodman (surname), a surname
 Woodman (horse), a thoroughbred racehorse

See also
 
 Woodsman, a competitive, co-ed intercollegiate sport in the United States, Canada and elsewhere 
 Logging, the process of cutting, processing, and moving trees to a location for transport
 Modern Woodmen of America, an American fraternal benefit society
 Assured Life Association, formerly Woodmen of the World and/or Assured Life Association, an American fraternal benefit society
 W.O.W. Hall (Woodmen of the World Hall), in Eugene, Oregon, U.S.
 Woodmen Hall (Stuart, Florida)
 Woodmen Hall (Saint Onge, South Dakota)
 Woodmen of Union Building, in Hot Springs, Arkansas, U.S.
 Tin Woodman, or the Tin Man, a fictional character in the Land of Oz by L. Frank Baum